Marsha P. Johnson (August 24, 1945 – July 6, 1992) also known as Malcolm Michaels Jr., was an American gay liberation activist and self-identified drag queen. Known as an outspoken advocate for gay rights, Johnson was one of the prominent figures in the Stonewall uprising of 1969. Though some have mistakenly credited Johnson for starting the riots, Johnson was always forthcoming about having not been present when the riots began.

Johnson was a founding member of the Gay Liberation Front and co-founded the radical activist group Street Transvestite Action Revolutionaries (S.T.A.R.), alongside close friend Sylvia Rivera. Johnson was also a popular figure in New York City's gay and art scene, modeling for Andy Warhol, and performing onstage with the drag performance troupe Hot Peaches. Johnson was known as the "mayor of Christopher Street" due to being a welcoming presence in the streets of Greenwich Village.  From 1987 through 1992, Johnson was an AIDS activist with ACT UP. 

Johnson's body was found floating in the Hudson River in 1992. Initially and quickly ruled a suicide by the NYPD, controversy and protest followed, eventually leading to a re-opening of the case as a possible homicide.

Biography

Early life 
Johnson was born Malcolm Michaels Jr. on August 24, 1945, in Elizabeth, New Jersey. Michaels' father, Malcolm Michaels Sr., was an assembly line worker at General Motors, while Michaels' mother, Alberta Claiborne, was a housekeeper. Michaels and their six siblings were raised in the Mount Teman African Methodist Episcopal Church. Commenting on this upbringing, Johnson said, "I got married to Jesus Christ when I was sixteen years old, still in high school."

Johnson first began wearing dresses at the age of five but stopped temporarily due to harassment by boys who lived nearby. In a 1992 interview, Johnson described being the young victim of rape by a thirteen-year-old boy. After this, Johnson described the idea of being gay as "some sort of dream", rather than something that seemed possible, and so chose to remain sexually inactive until leaving for New York City at 17. Johnson's mother reportedly said that being homosexual is like being "lower than a dog", but Johnson said that Alberta was unaware of the LGBT community. Johnson's mother also encouraged her child to find a "billionaire" boyfriend or husband to take care of (Johnson) for life, a goal Johnson often talked about.

After graduating from Edison High School (now the Thomas A. Edison Career and Technical Academy) in Elizabeth in 1963, Johnson left home for New York City with $15 and a bag of clothes. Johnson waited tables after moving to Greenwich Village in 1966. After Johnson began hanging out with the street hustlers near the Howard Johnson's at 6th Avenue and 8th Street, their life changed. Johnson came out and said "my life has been built around sex and gay liberation, being a drag queen" and sex work.

Performance work and identity 
Johnson initially used the moniker "Black Marsha" but later decided on the drag queen name "Marsha P. Johnson", getting Johnson from the restaurant Howard Johnson's on 42nd Street, stating that the P stood for "pay it no mind" and used the phrase sarcastically when questioned about gender, saying "it stands for 'pay it no mind'". Johnson said the phrase once to a judge, who was amused by it, leading to Johnson's release. Johnson variably identified as gay, as a transvestite, and as a queen (referring to drag queen or "street queen"). According to Susan Stryker, a professor of human gender and sexuality studies at the University of Arizona, Johnson's gender expression could perhaps most accurately be called gender non-conforming; Johnson never self-identified with the term transgender, but the term was also not in broad use while Johnson was alive.

The definitions used by Rivera and Johnson were not always the same as those documented in the more mainstream literature of the era. For instance, Rivera insisted on claiming transvestite solely for use by gay people, writing in the essay "Transvestites: Your Half Sisters and Half Brothers of the Revolution", "Transvestites are homosexual men and women who dress in clothes of the opposite sex." In an interview with Allen Young, in 1972's, Out of the Closets: Voices of Gay Liberation, Johnson discussed being a "Street Transvestite Action Revolutionary", saying, "A transvestite is still like a boy, very manly looking, a feminine boy." Johnson distinguishes this from transsexual, defining transsexuals as those who are on hormones and getting surgery. Also discussed are Johnson's experiences of the dangers of working as a street prostitute in drag, and Johnson's husband who was murdered. Johnson and Rivera's interviews and writings in this era also at times used terminology in ways that were sarcastic and camp, other times serious, or all of the above at once.

Johnson's style of drag was not serious ("high drag" or "show drag") due to being unable to afford to purchase clothing from expensive stores. Johnson received leftover flowers after sleeping under tables used for sorting flowers in the Flower District of Manhattan, and was known for wearing crowns of fresh flowers. Johnson was tall, slender and often dressed in flowing robes and shiny dresses, red plastic high heels and bright wigs, which tended to draw attention. As Edmund White writes in his 1979 Village Voice article, "The Politics of Drag", Johnson also liked dressing in ways that would display "the interstice between masculine and feminine". A feature photo of Johnson in this article shows Johnson in a flowing wig and makeup, and a translucent shirt, pants and parka – highlighting the ways that, quoting Kate Millett's Sexual Politics, White says, "she is both masculine and feminine at once."

There is some existing footage of Johnson doing full, glamorous, "high drag" on stage, but most of Johnson's performance work was with groups that were more grassroots, comedic, and political. Johnson sang and performed as a member of J. Camicias' international, NYC-based, drag performance troupe, Hot Peaches, from 1972 through to shows in the 1990s. When The Cockettes, a similar drag troupe from San Francisco, formed an East Coast troupe, The Angels of Light, Johnson was also asked to perform with them. In 1973, Johnson performed the role of "The Gypsy Queen" in the Angels' production, "The Enchanted Miracle", about the Comet Kohoutek. In 1975, Johnson was photographed by famed artist Andy Warhol, as part of a "Ladies and Gentlemen" series of Polaroids. In 1990, Johnson performed with The Hot Peaches in London. Johnson, who was also HIV positive, became an AIDS activist and appeared in The Hot Peaches production The Heat in 1990, singing the song "Love" while wearing an ACT UP, "Silence = Death" button.

While the photos of Johnson in dramatic, femme ensembles are the most well-known, there are also photos and film footage of Johnson dressed down in more daily wear of jeans and a flannel shirt and cap, or in shorts and a tank top, and no wig, such as at the Christopher Street Liberation March in 1979, or singing with the New York City Gay Men's Chorus at an AIDS memorial in the 1980s, or marching in a protest in Greenwich Village in 1992.

Though generally regarded as "generous and warmhearted" and "saintly" under the Marsha persona, Johnson's angry, violent side could sometimes emerge when Johnson was depressed or under severe stress. Some felt that it was more common for this to happen under Johnson's "male persona as Malcolm". During those moments when Johnson's violent side emerged, according to an acquaintance Robert Heide, Johnson could be aggressive and short-tempered and speak in a deeper voice and, as Malcolm, would "become a very nasty, vicious man, looking for fights". This dual personality of Johnson's has been described as "a schizophrenic personality at work". When this happened, Johnson would often get in fights and wind up hospitalized and sedated, and friends would have to organize and raise money to bail Johnson out of jail or try to secure release from places like Bellevue. In the 1979 Village Voice article, "The Drag of Politics", by Steven Watson, and further elaborated upon by Stonewall historian Carter, it had perhaps been for this reason that other activists had been reluctant at first to credit Johnson for helping to spark the gay liberation movement of the early 1970s. Watson also reported that Johnson's saintly personality was "volatile" and listed a roster of gay bars from which Johnson had been banned.

Stonewall uprising

Johnson was one of the first drag queens to go to the Stonewall Inn, after they began allowing women and drag queens inside; it was previously a bar for only gay men. On the early morning hours of June 28, 1969, the Stonewall uprising occurred. While the first two nights of rioting were the most intense, the clashes with police would result in a series of spontaneous demonstrations and marches through the gay neighborhoods of Greenwich Village for roughly a week afterwards.

Johnson has been named, along with Zazu Nova and Jackie Hormona, by a number of the Stonewall veterans interviewed by David Carter in his book, Stonewall: The Riots That Sparked the Gay Revolution, as being "three individuals known to have been in the vanguard" of the pushback against the police at the uprising. Johnson denied starting the uprising. In 1987, Johnson recalled arriving at around "2:00 [that morning]", that "the riots had already started" by that time and that the Stonewall building "was on fire" after police set it on fire. The riots reportedly started at around 1:20 that morning after Stormé DeLarverie fought back against the police officer who attempted to arrest her that night.

Carter writes that Robin Souza had reported that fellow Stonewall veterans and gay activists such as Morty Manford and Marty Robinson had told Souza that on the first night, Johnson "threw a shot glass at a mirror in the torched bar screaming, 'I got my civil rights'". Souza told the Gay Activists Alliance shortly afterwards that it "was the shot glass that was heard around the world". Carter, however, concluded that Robinson had given several different accounts of the night and in none of the accounts was Johnson's name brought up, possibly in fear that if he publicly credited the uprising to Johnson, then Johnson's well-known mental state and gender nonconforming, "could have been used effectively by the movement's opponents". The alleged "shot glass" incident has also been heavily disputed. Prior to Carter's book, it was claimed Johnson had "thrown a brick" at a police officer, an account that was never verified. Johnson also confirmed not being present at the Stonewall Inn when the rioting broke out, but instead had heard about it and went to get Sylvia Rivera who was at a park uptown sleeping on a bench to tell her about it. However, many have corroborated that on the second night, Johnson climbed up a lamppost and dropped a bag with a brick in it down on a police car, shattering the windshield.

Other activism 

Following the Stonewall uprising, Johnson joined the Gay Liberation Front and was active in the GLF Drag Queen Caucus. On the first anniversary of the Stonewall rebellion, on June 28, 1970, Johnson marched in the first Gay Pride rally, then called the Christopher Street Liberation Day. One of Johnson's most notable direct actions occurred in August 1970, staging a sit-in protest at Weinstein Hall at New York University alongside fellow GLF members after administrators canceled a dance when they found out was sponsored by gay organizations. Shortly after that, Johnson and close friend Sylvia Rivera co-founded the Street Transvestite Action Revolutionaries (STAR) organization (initially titled Street Transvestites Actual Revolutionaries). The two of them became a visible presence at gay liberation marches and other radical political actions. In 1973, Johnson and Rivera were banned from participating in the gay pride parade by the gay and lesbian committee who were administering the event stating they "weren't gonna allow drag queens" at their marches claiming they were "giving them a bad name". Their response was to march defiantly ahead of the parade. During a gay rights rally at New York City Hall in the early '70s, photographed by Diana Davies, a reporter asked Johnson why the group was demonstrating, Johnson shouted into the microphone, "Darling, I want my gay rights now!"

During another incident around this time Johnson was confronted by police officers for hustling in New York. When the officers attempted to perform an arrest, Johnson hit them with a handbag, which contained two bricks. When asked by the judge for an explanation for hustling, Johnson claimed to be trying to secure enough money for a tombstone for Johnson's husband. During a time when same-sex marriage was illegal in the United States, the judge asked what "happened to this alleged husband", Johnson responded, "Pig shot him". Initially sentenced to 90 days in prison for the assault, Johnson's lawyer eventually convinced the judge that Bellevue Hospital would be more suitable.

STAR House 

With Rivera, Johnson established STAR House, a shelter for homeless gay and trans youth in 1970, and paid the rent for it with money they made themselves as sex workers. While the House was not focused on performance, Johnson was a "drag mother" of STAR House, in the longstanding tradition of "Houses" as chosen family in the Black and Latino LGBT community. Johnson worked to provide food, clothing, emotional support and a sense of family for the young drag queens, trans women, gender nonconformists and other gay street kids living on the Christopher Street docks or in their house on the Lower East Side of New York. While the original location of STAR House was evicted in 1971 and the building was destroyed, the household existed in different configurations and at different locations over the years.

Later life 
By 1966, Johnson lived on the streets and engaged in survival sex. In connection with sex work, Johnson claimed to have been arrested over 100 times, and was also shot once, in the late 1970s. Johnson spoke of first having a mental breakdown in 1970. According to Bob Kohler, Johnson would walk naked up Christopher Street and be taken away for two or three months to be treated with chlorpromazine, an antipsychotic medication. Upon returning, the medication would wear off over the course of one month and Johnson would then return to normal.

Between 1980 and Johnson's death in 1992, Johnson lived with a friend, Randy Wicker, who had invited Johnson to stay the night one time when it was "very cold out—about 10 degrees [Fahrenheit]", and Marsha had just never left. When Wicker's lover, David, became terminally ill with AIDS, Johnson became his caregiver. After visiting David and other friends with the virus in the hospital during the AIDS pandemic, Johnson, who was also HIV-positive, became committed to sitting with the sick and dying, as well as doing street activism with AIDS activist groups including ACT UP.

In David France's documentary, The Death and Life of Marsha P. Johnson, Johnson is seen participating in a 1980s memorial service and action for those who've died of AIDS, along with members of the Gay Men's Health Crisis. In 1992, gay bashing was epidemic in New York. According to Matt Foreman, former director of the Anti-Violence Project, "Anti-LGBT violence was at a peak. That year we had 1,300 reports of bias crime. ... and 18% of those were based on violence perpetrated by police." It was an "unrelenting wave of attacks." In response, marches were organized, and Johnson was one of the activists who marched in the streets, demanding justice. Only weeks later, Johnson would also turn up dead under similar circumstances.

In 1992, George Segal's sculpture, Gay Liberation was moved to Christopher Park as part of the new Gay Liberation Monument. Johnson commented, "How many people have died for these two little statues to be put in the park to recognize gay people? How many years does it take for people to see that we're all brothers and sisters and human beings in the human race? I mean how many years does it take for people to see that we're all in this rat race together."

Johnson remained devoutly religious in later life, often lighting candles and praying at St. Mary's Catholic Church in Hoboken, saying in 1992: "I practice the Catholic religion because the Catholic religion is part of the Santería of the saints, which says that we are all brothers and sisters in Christ."

Johnson would also make offerings to the saints and spirits in a more personal manner, keeping a private altar at home when possible. As friend James Gallagher related in the Pay it No Mind documentary interviews, "Marsha would always say she went to the Greek Church, she went to the Catholic Church, she went to the Baptist Church, she went to the Jewish Temple - she said she was covering all angles." In the summer of 1991, Johnson participated in the interfaith AIDS memorial service at the Church of Saint Veronica in Greenwich Village. When asked about religion in the last interview, Johnson said "I use Jesus Christ the most in my prayers, most of the time." A neighbor also said Johnson would pray, prostrate on the floor in front of the statue of the Virgin Mary, in the church across from Randy Wicker's apartment (where Johnson lived in later years). Johnson's friend Sasha McCaffrey added, "I would find her in the strangest churches. She'd be wearing velvet and throwing glitter."

Johnson expressed a relationship with the Divine that was direct and personal, saying in the last interview (June 1992), about leaving home in 1963, "I got the Lord on my side, and I took him to my heart with me and I came to the city, for better or worse. And he said, 'You know, you might wind up with nothing.' 'Cause you know, me and Jesus is always talking. And I said, Honey, I don't care if I never have nothing ever till the day I die. All I want is my freedom." "I believe [Jesus is] the only man I can truly trust. He's like the spirit that follows me around, you know, and helps me out in my hour of need."

In Pay it No Mind friends Bob Kohler and Agosto Machado talk about Johnson's relationship with Neptune. Kohler tells a story of sunbathing at the Christopher Street Piers in the West Village when Johnson, naked, began grabbing at Kohler's shirt, shouting, "My father needs those clothes!" Johnson succeeded in pulling Kohler's shirt off and throwing it into the Hudson River. "These were sacrifices to her father, and to Neptune, who got all mixed up together," explains Kohler. Agosto Machado continues, "She was making offerings of flowers and change to King Neptune as an appeasement to help her friends who are on the other side."

Near the time of Johnson's death in 1992, Randy Wicker said Johnson was increasingly sick and in a fragile state. However, none of Johnson's friends or relatives believed Johnson was suicidal.

Death 
Shortly after the 1992 Gay pride parade, Johnson's body was discovered floating in the Hudson River. Police initially ruled the death a suicide, but Johnson's friends and other members of the local community insisted Johnson was not suicidal and noted that the back of Johnson's head had a massive wound.

Johnson's suspicious death occurred during a time when anti-LGBT violence was at a peak in New York City, including bias crime by police. Johnson was one of the activists who had been drawing attention to this epidemic of violence against the community, participating in marches and other activism to demand justice for victims, and an inquiry into how to stop the violence. Johnson had been speaking out against the "dirty cops" and elements of organized crime that many believed responsible for some of these assaults and murders, and had even voiced the concern that some of what Randy Wicker was stirring up, and pulling Johnson into, "could get you murdered." This added to the suspicions of foul play and possible murder.

Johnson's body was cremated and, following a funeral at a local church, and a march down Seventh Avenue, friends released Johnson's ashes over the Hudson River, off the Christopher Street Piers. Police allowed Seventh Avenue to be closed while Johnson's ashes were carried to the river. After the funeral, a series of demonstrations and marches to the police precinct took place, to demand justice for Johnson.

Postmortem developments 
According to Sylvia Rivera, their friend Bob Kohler believed Johnson had committed suicide due to an ever-increasing fragile state, which Rivera herself disputed, claiming she and Johnson had "made a pact" to "cross the 'River Jordan' (aka Hudson River) together". Those who were close to Johnson considered the death suspicious; many claimed that while Johnson did struggle mentally, this did not manifest itself as suicidal ideation. Randy Wicker later said that Johnson may have hallucinated and walked into the river, or may have jumped into the river to escape harassers, but stated that Johnson was never suicidal.

Several people came forward to say they had seen Johnson harassed by a group of "thugs" who had also robbed people. According to Wicker, a witness saw a neighborhood resident fighting with Johnson on July 4, 1992. During the fight he used a homophobic slur, and later bragged to someone at a bar that he had killed a drag queen named Marsha. The witness said that when he tried to tell police what he had seen his story was ignored. Other locals stated later that law enforcement was not interested in investigating Johnson's death, stating that the case was about a "gay black man" and wanting little to do with it at the time.

In December 2002, a police investigation resulted in reclassification of Johnson's cause of death from "suicide" to "undetermined".

Former New York politician Tom Duane fought to reopen the case, because "Usually when there is a death by suicide the person usually leaves a note. She didn't leave a note." In November 2012, activist Mariah Lopez succeeded in getting the New York police department to reopen the case as a possible homicide.

In 2016, Victoria Cruz of the Anti-Violence Project also tried to get Johnson's case reopened, and succeeded in gaining access to previously unreleased documents and witness statements. She sought out new interviews with witnesses, friends, other activists, and police who had worked the case or had been on the force at the time of Johnson's death. Some of her work to find justice for Johnson was filmed by David France for the 2017 documentary The Death and Life of Marsha P. Johnson.

Tributes 

 The 2012 documentary Pay It No Mind – The Life and Times of Marsha P. Johnson heavily features segments from a 1992 interview with Johnson, which was filmed shortly before Johnson's death. Many friends of Johnson's from Greenwich Village are interviewed for the documentary.
 Johnson appears as a character in two fictional film dramas that are based on real events, including Stonewall (2015), played by Otoja Abit, and Happy Birthday, Marsha! (2016), played by Mya Taylor. Both movies are creative interpretations, inspired by the Stonewall uprising.
 The 2017 documentary, The Death and Life of Marsha P. Johnson, follows trans woman Victoria Cruz of the Anti-Violence Project as she investigates Johnson's death. Like Pay It No Mind, it relies on archival footage and interviews.
 New York City artist Anohni produced multiple tributes to Johnson, including baroque pop band Antony and the Johnsons (named in Johnson's honor), and a 1995 play about Johnson, The Ascension of Marsha P. Johnson.
 American drag queen and TV personality RuPaul has called Johnson an inspiration, describing Johnson as "the true Drag Mother". During an episode of his show RuPaul's Drag Race in 2012, RuPaul told her contestants that Johnson "paved the way for all of [them]".
 In 2018 the New York Times published a belated obituary for Johnson.
 A large, painted mural depicting Johnson and Sylvia Rivera went on display in Dallas, Texas, in 2019 to commemorate the 50th anniversary of the Stonewall riots. The painting of the "two pioneers of the gay rights movement" in front of a transgender flag claims to be the world's largest mural honoring the trans community.
 On May 30, 2019, it was announced that Johnson and Sylvia Rivera would be honored with monuments at Greenwich Village, near the site of the Stonewall club. Construction is rumored to be completed by 2021. These monuments of Johnson and Rivera will be the world's first to honor transgender activists.
 On May 31, 2019, queer street artists Homo Riot and Suriani created a mural, as part of the WorldPride Mural Project and Stonewall 50 – WorldPride NYC 2019, and dedicated to Queer Liberation, featuring multiple images of Johnson. The mural, located at 2nd Avenue and Houston Street in New York City, was curated by photographer and filmmaker Daniel "Dusty" Albanese.
 In June 2019, Johnson was one of the inaugural fifty American "pioneers, trailblazers, and heroes" inducted on the National LGBTQ Wall of Honor within the Stonewall National Monument (SNM) in New York City's Stonewall Inn. The SNM is the first U.S. national monument dedicated to LGBTQ rights and history, and the wall's unveiling was timed to take place during the 50th anniversary of the Stonewall riots.
 On June 30, 2020, Google celebrated Marsha P. Johnson with a Google Doodle.
 In August 2020 the Union County, New Jersey Office of LGBTQ Affairs announced Johnson's hometown, Elizabeth, New Jersey, would erect a monument to Johnson. A petition to remove the Christopher Columbus monument and replace it with a statue of Johnson received over 75,000 signatures. A mural of Johnson, also in Elizabeth, was vandalized during Pride Month in June 2021. Community organizers vowed to fund restoration of the mural to honor Pride Month and Johnson's legacy.
On August 24, 2020, the 75th anniversary of Johnson's birth, the Marsha P. Johnson State Park was renamed in Johnson's honor, becoming the first New York state park named after an openly LGBT person. Two years later, governor Kathy Hochul announced that a new gate to the park would be constructed in Johnson's honor.

See also 

 Lee Brewster – founder of the Queens Liberation Front
 LGBT culture in New York City
 List of LGBT people from New York City
 Stormé DeLarverie – biracial butch lesbian whose resistance of arrest incited the Stonewall uprising
 Thomas Lanigan-Schmidt – fellow Stonewall veteran, artist, and Union County native
 Paris Is Burning – 1990 film about black drag culture in New York City in the 1980s

References

Sources

External links

Photos 
 Randy Wicker's Marsha P. Johnson album on Flickr
 Photographs of Marsha P. Johnson by Diana Davies at the New York Public Library Digital Collections (note: the photo of the much younger person, sitting on the table wearing a headscarf, has been mislabeled; it is actually GLF and Youth Group member, Zazu Nova, also a Stonewall veteran)
 "Stonewall 1979: The Politics of Drag" archive of Village Voice article by Edmund White, features photo of Marsha Johnson

Print interviews 
 The Drag of Politics – June 15, 1979, article in the Village Voice when Johnson was 34

Videos 
  (performance footage - clips from a number of different shows with Hot Peaches and at several benefits) 
  (excerpt from an interview with Randy Wicker at the Christopher Street Piers on September 21, 1995)
  (conversations with friends of Johnson)
  (interview with a friend who may have seen the men who assaulted Johnson)

1945 births
1992 deaths
American prostitutes
American civil rights activists
African-American drag queens
Members of ACT UP
LGBT African Americans
American LGBT rights activists
LGBT people from New Jersey
Gay entertainers
People from Elizabeth, New Jersey
People from Greenwich Village
LGBT people from New York (state)
Gay Liberation Front members
Activists from New Jersey
Activists from New York (state)
LGBT Roman Catholics
Transgender rights activists
African-American Catholics
HIV/AIDS activists
Roman Catholic activists
People with HIV/AIDS
20th-century American LGBT people
LGBT prostitutes